Portunus trituberculatus, the gazami crab, South Korea's blue crab or horse crab, is the most widely fished species of crab in the world. It is found off the coasts of East Asia and is closely related to Portunus armatus.

Fishery
Portunus trituberculatus is the world's most heavily fished crab species, with over 300,000 tonnes being caught annually, 98% of it off the coast of China. This is because it is considered highly nutritious, especially in regard to crab cream (roe).

Distribution
Portunus trituberculatus is found off the coasts of Japan, Korea, China, Palau and Taiwan.

Description
P. trituberculatus may be distinguished from the closely related (and also widely fished) P. armatus by the number of broad teeth on the front of the carapace (three in P. trituberculatus, four in P. armatus) and on the inner margin of the merus (four in P. trituberculatus, three in P. armatus).

Relationship to humans

Controversy 
Due to the increased farming scale and breeding of Portunus trituberculatus, the farming environment of the gazami crab has greatly decayed. It has also diminished the gazami crab's immune system which has led to the decline in its ability to fight off diseases. This can be observed by looking at the tooth-paste disease along with the emulsification disease that is caused by vibrio. These two diseases have caused a great deal of damage to Portunus trituberculatus which has created severe economic losses and deprivation to the industry. These diseases have ultimately reduced the comfort and healthy evolution of the gazami crab's farming industry.

Taxonomy
Portunus trituberculatus was first described by Edward J. Miers in 1876, under the name Neptunus trituberculatus. To better understand the species development, evolution and reproduction a reference genome has been sequenced, assembling to 1.0 Gb in size and anchoring to 50 chromosomes. And demonstrating it diverged from the Chinese mitten crab around 183.5 million years ago.

Virus research
In 2019 it was discovered that gazami crab populations in China are commonly infected with the Flavivirus Wenzhou shark flavivirus which was previously identified in all tissues of the Pacific spadenose shark, Scoliodon macrorhynchos. While currently unknown if Wenzhou shark flavivirus causes disease in infected shark hosts, this virus moves horizontally between gazami crabs and sharks in ocean ecosystems in a manner similar to other Flavivirus infections such as Dengue virus, which cycle horizontally between arthropod (mosquito) and vertebrate hosts.

References

Portunoidea
Edible crustaceans
Commercial crustaceans
Crustaceans described in 1876
Korean seafood
Taxa named by Edward J. Miers